Caulerpa chemnitzia is a species of seaweed in the Caulerpaceae family.

It is found along the coast in a large area extending from north of Perth to the Kimberley region of Western Australia.

References

chemnitzia
Species described in 1809